Chin Owlak (also Romanized as Chīn Owl'ak) is a village in Kiyaras Rural District, in the Central District of Gotvand County, Khuzestan Province, Iran. At the 2006 census, its population was 37, in with families.

References 

Populated places in Gotvand County